This is a list of listed buildings in the parish of Arisaig and Moidart in Highland, Scotland.

List 

|}

Key

See also 
 List of listed buildings in Highland

Notes

References
 All entries, addresses and coordinates are based on data from Historic Scotland. This data falls under the Open Government Licence

Arisaig And Moidart